Fire officer can refer to:
A senior firefighter
Fire safety officer, an individual employed by an organisation, including a fire service, to advise on fire safety

Firefighting